Sally is a musical comedy with music by Jerome Kern, lyrics by Clifford Grey and book by Guy Bolton (inspired by the 19th century show, Sally in our Alley), with additional lyrics by Buddy De Sylva, Anne Caldwell and P. G. Wodehouse. The plot hinges on a mistaken identity: Sally, a waif, is a dishwasher at the Alley Inn.  She poses as a famous foreign ballerina and rises to fame (and finds love) through joining the Ziegfeld Follies.  There is a rags to riches story, a ballet as a centrepiece, and a wedding as a finale. "Look for the Silver Lining" continues to be one of Kern's most familiar songs.  The song is lampooned by another song, "Look for a Sky of Blue," in Rick Besoyan's satirical 1959 musical Little Mary Sunshine.

The piece was first produced in 1920 on Broadway by Florenz Ziegfeld, and ran for 570 performances, one of the longest runs on Broadway up to that time. The show was designed as a debut star vehicle for Marilyn Miller. It had a successful London run and was revived several times on Broadway and in the West End, although it has had few productions since the 1950s. The musical was adapted into a 1925 silent film and a 1929 musical film.

Background and original production
Kern, Bolton, and Wodehouse had collaborated on a number of musical comedies at the Princess Theatre.  The story combined the innocence of these earlier "Princess musicals" with the lavishness of the "Ziegfeld Follies" formula. The score recycles some material from previous Kern shows, including "Look for the Silver Lining" and "Whip-poor-will" (with lyrics by De Sylva, from the flop "Zip Goes a Million"); "The Lorelei" (lyrics by Anne Caldwell); and "You Can't Keep a Good Girl Down" and "The Church 'Round the Corner" (lyrics by Wodehouse). Grey supplied the lyrics for the few new songs in the score.  At the request of Ziegfeld, Victor Herbert was engaged to write the music to "The Butterfly Ballet" in Act Three.

The musical was originally produced by Florenz Ziegfeld, opening on December 21, 1920 at the New Amsterdam Theatre on Broadway.  It ran for 570 performances, which was one of the longest runs on Broadway up to that time.  By the time it closed in 1924 (including revivals), it would prove to be among the top five money makers of the 1920s. The show was designed as the musical comedy debut of Marilyn Miller, a 22-year-old Ziegfeld Follies girl.  Miller would continue to be a star on Broadway until her death in 1936.

Roles and original cast

"Pops", proprietor of the Alley Inn, New York – Alfred P. James
Rosalind Rafferty, a manicurist – Mary Hay 
Madame Nookerova's maid – Mary Hay 
Sascha, Violinist at the Alley Inn – Jacques Rebiroff
Otis Hooper, a theatrical agent – Walter Catlett
Mrs. Ten Broek, a settlement worker – Dolores 
Sally of the Alley, a foundling – Marilyn Miller  
Madame Nookerova, a Wild Rose – Marilyn Miller  
Premier Star of the Follies – Marilyn Miller  
Connie, a waiter at the Alley Inn – Leon Errol
Duke of Czechogovinia – Leon Errol
Miss New York, a niece – Agatha Dehussey
Admiral Travers, a gay one – Phil Ryley
Blair Farquar, an only son – Irving Fisher
Jimmie Spelvin – Stanley Ridges
Billy Porter – Wade Boothe
Harry Burton – Jack Barker

Musical numbers

Act I
 Opening and Violin Solo
 The Night Time - Jimmie Spelvin and Ensemble (lyrics by Grey)
 On with the Dance - Otis Hooper, Rosalind, Betty and Harry Burton (lyrics by Grey)
 On with the Dance (Encore) -  Otis Hooper, Rosalind, Betty and Harry Burton
 Joan of Arc ("You Can't Keep a Good Girl Down") - Sally of the Alley and Foundlings (lyrics by Grey & Wodehouse)
 Look for the Silver Lining - Sally and Blair Farquar (lyrics by De Sylva)
 Look for the Silver Lining - (Reprise) - Sally, Duke of Czechogovinio, Boys and Girls
 Sally - Blair and Ensemble (lyrics by Grey)
 Dance - Sally
 Finale Act One - Sally, Duke of Czechogovinio, Otis Hooper, Rosalind and Company

Act II
 Opening Act II: The Social Game - Jimmie and Ensemble 
 Wild Rose - Sally and Diplomats (lyrics by Grey) 
 (On the Banks of) The Schnitza Komisski - Duke of Czechogovinio and Ensemble (lyrics by Grey)
 Schnitza Komisski Dance (Pzcherkatrotsky) - Duke of Czechogovinio 
 Whip-poor-will - Sally and Blair (lyrics by De Sylva)
 The Lorelei - Otis Hooper, Rosalind and Jimmie (lyrics by Anne Caldwell)
 The Church Around the Corner - Rosalind and Otis (lyrics by Grey & Wodehouse) 
 Finale Act II: - Entire Company
Act III
 Land of Butterflies (ballet) (music By Victor Herbert)
 Wild Rose (Reprise) - Sally and Boys
 Finale - Dear Little Church 'Round the Corner

Subsequent productions
The musical enjoyed a successful production in 1921 in London at the Winter Garden Theatre, starring British musical comedy veterans George Grossmith Jr. and Leslie Henson, which ran for 387 performances.

It also played well in 1923 in Australia, produced by the J. C. Williamson company.  There were Broadway revivals in 1923 (at the New Amsterdam Theatre) and 1948 and London revivals in 1942 (at Prince's Theatre) and 1952 (Oxford New Theatre).  Other productions included a 1944 LACLO Production in Los Angeles, California and a 1988 concert production Off-Broadway at the Academy Theatre.

Adaptations

A 1925 silent romantic comedy film of the same name starred Colleen Moore and was directed by Alfred E. Green, produced by Moore's husband John McCormick.  The screenplay was adapted by June Mathis.

The 1929 musical film version was only the third all talking all-color feature movie ever made. It retains three of Kern's songs ("Look for the Silver Lining", "Sally", and "Wild Rose").  The rest of the music newly written for the film by Al Dubin and Joe Burke. Miller was hired by the Warner Brothers to reprise her role at an extravagant sum (reportedly $1,000 an hour for a total of $100,000). The film was nominated for an Academy Award for Best Art Direction by Jack Okey in 1930.

Sally was presented on The Railroad Hour April 6, 1953. The 30-minute radio adaptation starred Gordon MacRae and Lucille Norman.

References and sources
References

Sources
Description of the musical
Synopsis and other information about the musical

External links
Midi files and links
Vocal score
 
NY Times review of a 1988 staged concert
Information about the Australian production
Site gives length of long-running shows

1920 musicals
Broadway musicals
Musicals by Jerome Kern
Musicals set in the Roaring Twenties